Henry G. Smith (1807 – December 31, 1878) was a justice of the Tennessee Supreme Court from 1867 to 1870.

Born in Connecticut, Smith was one of the judges serving on the highly partisan "apocryphal" court, which was in place in Tennessee between the end of the American Civil War and the enactment of the Constitution of 1870. The justices who served on this court "without exception, were bitter partisans" who "had all been Union men, and... took the partisan view of all questions growing out of the war". Of this group, Smith is described as one of several "of mediocre ability, who could not by possibility have reached a position of such importance in ordinary times", though he was also later eulogized as one of the "most talented citizens" of the state. Smith served as a member of the Tennessee Senate from 1877 until his death the following year.

Smith died at his home in Memphis on New Year's Eve, having just returned home from a citizen's mass meeting. He was reported as having "returned to his home apparently in good health, but on entering his room fell dead on the floor, without speaking". Smith left an estate of about $50,000, a small fortune at the time, which his will primarily divided between Smith's widow, his brother George, and his sister Caroline.

References

1807 births
1878 deaths
People from Connecticut
Justices of the Tennessee Supreme Court